Archery at the 1984 Summer Paralympics consisted of eighteen events, fourteen for men and four for women.

Medal table

Participating nations

Medal summary

Men's events

Women's events

References 

 

1984 Summer Paralympics events
1984
Paralympics